Raúl Ramírez won the singles title at the 1977 Queen's Club Championships tennis tournament defeating  Mark Cox in the final 9–7, 7–5.

Seeds

  Jimmy Connors (second round)
  Guillermo Vilas (second round)
  Ilie Năstase (third round)
  Brian Gottfried (semifinals)

Draw

Finals

Top half

Section 1

Section 2

Bottom half

Section 3

Section 4

References

External links
Official website Queen's Club Championships 
ATP tournament profile

Singles